This is a list of Eswatini women Twenty20 International cricketers. A Women's Twenty20 International (WT20I) is an international cricket match between two representative teams. A WT20I is played under the rules of Twenty20 cricket. In April 2018, the International Cricket Council (ICC) granted full international status to Twenty20 women's matches played between member sides from 1 July 2018 onwards. Eswatini women played their first WT20I on 9 September 2021 against Botswana during the 2021 ICC Women's T20 World Cup Africa Qualifier.

This list comprises all members of the Eswatini women's cricket team who have played at least one T20I match. It is initially arranged in the order in which each player won her first Twenty20 cap. Where more than one player will win her first Women's Twenty20 cap in the same match, those players are listed alphabetically by surname (according to the name format used by Cricinfo).

Key

List of players
Statistics are correct as of 31 July 2022.

References

Eswatini
Women
 
Women's sport in Eswatini